Goethel or Göthel is a German surname. Notable people with the surname include:

Karl J. Goethel (1930–1996), American lawyer and politician
Ralf Göthel, East German biathlete
Travis Goethel (born 1987), American football player

See also
Gothel (disambiguation)

German-language surnames